Daryab may refer to:

Daryab, Hamadan
Daryab, Kohgiluyeh and Boyer-Ahmad
Daryab, Lorestan